Swalmen is a town in the south-eastern Netherlands. The town is situated between the German border and the river Meuse (Maas in Dutch).

Until 1 January 2007, Swalmen was a separate municipality, covering the villages Swalmen, Asselt and Boukoul. These are now part of the municipality of Roermond.

Many monuments are found in Swalmen, most notable the Hillenraad castle, the romanesque 'Rozenkerkje' church in Asselt, and castle farms Graeterhof and Zuidewijk Spick. The area attracts tourists for its peaceful surroundings, asparagus, the  Groenewoud forest and forestrial swimming pool de Bosberg.

In 1863, the Swalmen railway station opened on the Maastricht to Venlo railway line. In 2003, the railway line was moved to make room for the A73 motorway and the railway station is now detached from the rails. The building was scheduled for demolition, however it has remained.

The only physical Max Verstappen shop is located in Swalmen.

Gallery

References

External links
Koninklijke Harmonie St. Caecilia Swalmen
Official website
Website Harmonie Amicitia Boukoul
de Bosberg swimming pool website

Municipalities of the Netherlands disestablished in 2007
Populated places in Limburg (Netherlands)
Former municipalities of Limburg (Netherlands)
Roermond